The Omar Associates women's cricket team is a Pakistani women's cricket team, sponsored by Omar Associates. They competed in the National Women's Cricket Championship and the Women's Cricket Challenge Trophy between 2014 and 2016. They won one Women's Cricket Challenge Trophy, shared with Zarai Taraqiati Bank Limited.

History
Omar Associates first competed in the 2014 Women's Cricket Challenge Trophy, in which they qualified for the final on Net Run Rate after winning one of their three group stage matches. The final against Zarai Taraqiati Bank Limited was curtailed due to rain, so the title was shared between the two teams. The next season of the Challenge Trophy, 2015–16, Omar Associates finished third in their group, with two wins from four matches.

Omar Associates also competed in the National Women's Cricket Championship in 2015 and 2016. In 2015, they reached the Super League stage of the competition, and eventually finished third overall. In 2016, all three of their matches were cancelled via walk-over.

Players

Notable players
Players who played for Omar Associates and played internationally are listed below, in order of first international appearance (given in brackets):

 Asmavia Iqbal (2005)
 Sumaiya Siddiqi (2007)
 Sadia Yousuf (2008)
 Javeria Rauf (2008)
 Naila Nazir (2009)
 Marina Iqbal (2009)
 Shumaila Qureshi (2010)
 Mariam Hasan (2010)
 Kainat Imtiaz (2010)
 Sidra Ameen (2011)
 Iram Javed (2013)
 Maham Tariq (2014)
 Sidra Nawaz (2014)
 Muneeba Ali (2016)
 Nashra Sandhu (2017)
 Fareeha Mehmood (2018)
 Omaima Sohail (2018)
 Rameen Shamim (2019)

Seasons

National Women's Cricket Championship

Women's Cricket Challenge Trophy

Honours
 National Women's Cricket Championship:
 Winners (0):
 Best finish: 3rd (2015)
 Women's Cricket Challenge Trophy
 Winners (1): 2014

References

Women's cricket teams in Pakistan